MVD special camps of the Gulag (osobye lagerya, osoblags) was a system of special labor camps established addressing the February 21, 1948 decree 416—159сс of the USSR Council of Ministers of February 28 decree 00219 of the Soviet Ministry of Internal Affairs exclusively for a "special contingent" of political prisoners, convicted according to the more severe sub-articles of Article 58 (Enemies of people): treason, espionage, terrorism, etc., for various real  political opponents, such as Trotskyists, "nationalists" (Ukrainian nationalism), white émigrés, as well as for fabricated ones.

History
In 1954, after the death of Stalin, most of them were reorganized into regular corrective labor camps.

Initially, in February 1948 5 osoblags were established, nameless, numbered from 1 to 5. Later they were given codenames, accordingly,  Mineralny Минеральный (Minlag), Gorny Горный (Gorlag), Dubravny Дубравный (Dubravlag), Stepnoy Степной (Steplag) and  Beregovoy Береговой (Berlag). Russian political prisoner and writer Georgy Demidov notices that this naming was arbitrary, unlike regular Gulag camps, which were commonly named after geographical features or major occupation.

Later the following osoblags were created:  Rechnoy Речной (Rechlag, August 1948), Ozyorny Озерный (Ozyorlag/Ozerlag, December 1948,  Песчаный (Peschanlag),  Луговой (Luglag),  Камышовый (Kamyshlag), Дальний (distinguish from ), and  Водораздельный (Vodorazdellag).

See also
Special camp (disambiguation), for other types of Soviet special camps

References

Camps of the Gulag
 
1940s in the Soviet Union